Josette Banzet, Marquise de Bruyenne (April 6, 1938 – December 4, 2020) was an American-based actress. She won a Golden Globe Award for Best Supporting Actress in a Series, Miniseries or Television Film for her performance in Rich Man, Poor Man.

Biography
The daughter of a French politician, Banzet was raised in Paris, Indochina, and Morocco.  She attended college in Miami, where she met her first husband; they divorced soon after.  She then pursued acting, where she appeared in a play on Broadway, and then moved to Hollywood, where she began her acting career.  In 1973, she married Hollywood public relations mogul, Warren Cowan.  Her third marriage was to American pop music star, Tommy Roe.  On March 22, 2019, Roe announced that Banzet was suffering from advanced stages of Alzheimer's.

Filmography
Rich Man, Poor Man (1976)
The Other Side of Midnight (1977)
Blind Ambition (1979)
Hollywood Knight (1979)

References

External links

1938 births
2020 deaths
French nobility
Best Supporting Actress Golden Globe (television) winners
French film actresses
French television actresses
French emigrants to the United States
Place of birth missing
American film actresses
American television actresses
20th-century French actresses
20th-century American actresses
Actresses from Paris
21st-century American women
Burials at Westwood Village Memorial Park Cemetery